Kevin Kam Møller (born 20 June 1989) is a Danish handball player for SG Flensburg-Handewitt and for the Danish national team.

Honours
 EHF Champions League:
: 2021
Spanish Championship:
: 2019, 2020, 2021
Copa del Rey:
: 2019, 2020, 2021
Copa ASOBAL:
: 2019, 2020, 2021
Supercopa ASOBAL:
: 2019, 2020, 2021
German Championship:
: 2018
: 2016, 2017
: 2015
DHB-Pokal:
: 2015
IHF Super Globe:
: 2018, 2019

References

External links

1989 births
Living people
SG Flensburg-Handewitt players
FC Barcelona Handbol players
Danish male handball players
Handball-Bundesliga players
Liga ASOBAL players
Expatriate handball players
Danish expatriate sportspeople in Germany
Danish expatriate sportspeople in Spain
People from Tønder Municipality
Handball players at the 2020 Summer Olympics
Medalists at the 2020 Summer Olympics
Olympic silver medalists for Denmark
Olympic medalists in handball
Sportspeople from the Region of Southern Denmark